Hubert Tubbs is an American vocalist, singer, and songwriter of soul, funk, and gospel and has cooperated with a number of music acts.

His debut introduction was as a lead vocalist for the band Tower of Power (also known as TOP), an American R&B-based band, originating in Oakland, California. In 1975 he replaced Lenny Williams, who had fronted the band between early 1973 and late 1974.

Tubbs became lead vocalist for TOP's 1975 album In the Slot and again appearing as lead singer for the band's 1976 tour and live album Live and in Living Color.  He would serve as a co-writer on the ensuing albums Ain't Nothin' Stoppin' Us Now in 1976 with "You Ought to Be Havin' Fun" and 1978 album We Came to Play! with "Share My Life" and "Am I a Fool?".

In 2007, he collaborated with The Freedom Warriors in a joint album called ... And Nothing But the Truth that featured Tubbs and Sista Sonic. In 2008 he appeared with The Johnwaynes in the EP Muzzle that featured Tubbs and in deep house artist Fritz Da Groove in the MP3 "It's Alright" / "Sunshine".

In 2014, he came to prominence again with being featured as vocalist for the French electropop trio Panzer Flower in their song "We Are Beautiful".

Discography

Albums and EPs
with Tower of Power
1975: In the Slot
1976: Live and in Living Color
Joint albums
2007: ... And Nothing But the Truth (The Freedom Warriors featuring Hubert Tubbs and Sista Sonic)
2008: Muzzle EP (The Johnwaynes featuring Hubert Tubbs)

Singles
Featured in

Others
2008: "It's Alright" / "Sunshine" (Fritz Da Groove featuring Hubert Tubbs)

In popular culture
in 1987, he was part of the soundtrack for the film Blind Date with the song "Crash, Bang, Boom".

References

External links
Discogs

American male singers
Living people
Year of birth missing (living people)